Wilmington Park was a ballpark in Wilmington, Delaware that was located at the corner of 30th Street and Governor Printz Boulevard. It was home to the University of Delaware football team from 1940 to 1952 and the Wilmington Blue Rocks of the Class B Interstate League from 1940 to 1952. The Blue Rocks were an affiliate of the Philadelphia Athletics from 1940 to 1943 and the Philadelphia Phillies from 1944 to 1952.

History

Early in 1940, construction plans for the ballpark were announced.[Wilmington News-Journal, Jan 23, 1940, p.20] The park was bounded by 30th Street (northeast, third base); Governor Printz Boulevard a.k.a. Northeast Boulevard (southeast, left field); 28th Street (southwest, right field); and Church Street and eventually Kerry Drive-In Theater (to the northwest, first base).

The Wilmington Blue Rocks minor league baseball team played at the ballpark from 1940 to 1952. They opened the park on May 1, 1940, with a 3-1 victory over Trenton, in front of 7,000 fans.[Wilmington Morning News, May 2, 1940, p.17]

The Blue Rocks established a Class B attendance record in 1940 with 145,643 attending ballgames at Wilmington Park. The club topped that mark with 172,531 fans in 1944. The single game attendance record for the Blue Rocks was set in 1947 when 7,062 fans saw Curt Simmons’ Wilmington debut. Attendance in 1950 dropped to 38,678, and despite a slight improvement to 43,135 in 1951, attendance continued to decline in 1952, the last for the Blue Rocks at the ballpark.

During World War II, in January 1943, Major League Baseball Commissioner Kenesaw Mountain Landis ordered most Major League clubs to hold spring training north of the Ohio and Potomac rivers to comply with government requests to help the war effort by eliminating nonessential travel. The Philadelphia Athletics held spring training at Wilmington Park in 1943 and the Philadelphia Phillies at the park in 1944 and 1945.

In addition to World War II-spring training games at Wilmington Park, the Phillies played occasional exhibition games at the ballpark including games against the Blue Rocks. The Phillies and Athletics had long played pre-season exhibition games against each other in the Philadelphia City Series. The A's moved to Kansas City prior to the 1955 season but returned to the Philadelphia-area for a final match-up prior to 1955 Opening Day. They played the 1955 series at Wilmington where the A's beat the Phillies 9–6 on April 9, 1955, and 10–2 on April 10, 1955.

5,907 fans watched the Brooklyn Dodgers and New York Yankees play a preseason exhibition game on April 10, 1941.

The Philadelphia Stars Negro league baseball team hosted the Newark Eagles at the ballpark on Memorial Day in 1945.

The University of Delaware Fightin' Blue Hens football team played its home games at the park from 1940 until 1952. Delaware had played at Frazer Field in Newark before moving to Wilmington Park midway through the 1940 season. Delaware played its first game at Wilmington Park on November 9, 1940, and beat Pennsylvania Military College 14–7. While Delaware continued to play occasional games at Frazer Field through the 1946 season, the team played its home games at Wilmington Park until midway through the 1952 season. In their last game at the ballpark, Delaware beat Pennsylvania Military College, 43–20. Delaware finished the 1952 season at the brand-new Delaware Stadium which returned the team to Newark and the university campus.

With the primary tenants gone after 1952, debate about what to do with the park was a perennial topic for about the next decade. The property was finally sold in February, 1962. Later in the year, Wilmington Park and the Drive-In were both demolished to make room for a shopping center.

References

External links
Wilmington Baseball History

Sports venues completed in 1940
Defunct college football venues
Delaware Fightin' Blue Hens football
Philadelphia Athletics spring training venues
Philadelphia Phillies spring training venues
Defunct minor league baseball venues
Baseball venues in Delaware
American football venues in Delaware
Spring training ballparks
Buildings and structures in Wilmington, Delaware
Defunct sports venues in Delaware
1940 establishments in Delaware
1963 disestablishments in Delaware
Sports venues demolished in 1963
Wilmington Clippers